The former Physical Education Building of the Arkansas Tech University is a historic academic building at 1502 North El Paso Avenue in Russellville, Arkansas.  It is a two-story brick Classical Revival structure, built in 1937 with funding from the Federal Emergency Administration of Public Works.  Now known as the Techionery Building, the building currently houses the Arkansas Tech Museum with displays about the history of the university.

The building was listed on the National Register of Historic Places in 1992.

See also
National Register of Historic Places listings in Pope County, Arkansas

References

External links
 Arkansas Tech Museum

University and college buildings on the National Register of Historic Places in Arkansas
Colonial Revival architecture in Arkansas
University and college buildings completed in 1937
Buildings and structures in Russellville, Arkansas
Arkansas Tech University
Museums in Pope County, Arkansas
University museums in Arkansas
Education museums in the United States
1937 establishments in Arkansas
Public Works Administration in Arkansas
Arkansas Tech University